The 2016 Intercontinental GT Challenge was the first season of the Intercontinental GT Challenge. The season featured three rounds — after the cancellation of the 6 Hours of the Americas - starting with Liqui Moly Bathurst 12 Hour on 7 February and the season concluded with the Sepang 12 Hours on 10 December.

Calendar
On 29 January it was announced that the 6 Hours of the Americas would be cancelled with the official reason a lack of entrants. The test days of the Blancpain GT Series Endurance Cup were only four days after the event, so the European teams would be cutting it close for both events. Instead, the organizers postponed the race for a year, but there were no plans to run the race.

Entry list

Intercontinental GT Challenge entries

Am Drivers entries
It is unknown which drivers competed for the Am Drivers' championship at Round 1 at Bathurst, besides those who scored points. No drivers entered for the Am Drivers' championship at Round 3 at Sepang.

Race results

Championship standings
Scoring system
Championship points were awarded for the first ten positions in each race. Entries were required to complete 75% of the winning car's race distance in order to be classified and earn points. Individual drivers were required to participate for a minimum of 25 minutes in order to earn championship points in any race. A manufacturer only received points for its two highest placed cars in each round.

Drivers' championships
The results indicate the classification relative to other drivers in the series, not the classification in the race.

Am Drivers

Manufacturers' championship

See also
 Intercontinental GT Challenge

Notes

References

External links
 

 
2016 in motorsport